The 1972 Midlands International, also known as the Omaha International, was a men's tennis tournament played on indoor carpet courts at the City Auditorium in Omaha, Nebraska, in the United States that was part of the 1972 USLTA Indoor Circuit. It was the third edition of the event and was held from January 26 through January 30, 1972. First-seeded foreign player Ilie Năstase won the singles title and earned $3,000 first-prize money as well as 15 points for the Boise Cascade Classic ranking..

Finals

Singles
 Ilie Năstase defeated  Ion Țiriac 2–6, 6–1, 6–1
 It was Năstase's 2nd singles title of the year and 14th of his career.

Doubles
 Ilie Năstase /  Ion Țiriac defeated  Andrés Gimeno /  Manuel Orantes 5–7, 6–4, 7–6

References

External links
 ITF tournament edition details

Midlands International
Midlands International
Midlands International